The LWS-2 was the Polish air ambulance aircraft prototype, designed in the late-1930s in the LWS factory (Lublin Aircraft Factory).

Design and development
The LWS-2 was designed as a light ambulance aircraft, for a requirement of the Polish Air Force and the Polish Red Cross (PCK), which was operating military ambulances. A preliminary design was made in 1936 by Zbysław Ciołkosz, the main designer of the LWS factory, follower by Jerzy Teisseyre's detailed design. It was influenced by RWD-9 and RWD-13 planes of the RWD team, especially their wing construction with rich wing mechanization, that gave it STOL capabilities. The prototype was built using PCK funds. Aircraft was registered SP-ATP and flown in autumn of 1937.

The Polish Red Cross ordered six aircraft, but the LWS factory was busy at that time with military production (RWD-14 Czapla and LWS-3 Mewa), and they were not built by the outbreak of World War II. LWS's next design, the LWS-3 Mewa close reconnaissance plane, utilized many features of the LWS-2, and was generally similar.

Description
Mixed construction (steel and wood) braced high-wing monoplane, conventional in layout. Fuselage of a steel frame, canvas covered (engine part with duralumin). Two-spar straight wings of wooden construction, with slats, flaps and flaperons, covered with canvas and plywood (in front), rectangular with rounded tips and narrowing near the fuselage. The wings were supported with V-struts and were folding rearwards. Cantilever empennage, covered with plywood (stabilizers) and canvas (rudder and elevators). Conventional fixed landing gear, with a rear skid. Capacity of four in a closed cockpit: a pilot in front, a doctor behind him, and two lying on stretchers at the back. It had a 9-cylinder air-cooled Avia-built Wright Whirlwind J-5 radial engine delivering 220 hp (164 kW) nominal power and 240 hp (179 kW) take-off power. Two-blade metal propeller Ratier, of variable pitch. A 130-liter fuel tank behind the engine. Cruise fuel consumption 48 L/h.

Operational history
On May 19, 1938 the prototype was given to the Air Force. Between July 1 and July 4, 1938, the LWS-2 prototype took part in an International Ambulance Aircraft Contest in Esch in Luxembourg, and won first place and a cup for the best accommodation in a cab for the injured.

The prototype was later used by the Polish Red Cross. Its fate during the World War II is not clear, as the damaged plane was captured by the Germans on airfield at Krosno.

Operators

Polish Red Cross operated one prototype, ordered 6 aircraft, none delivered.

Specifications (LWS-2)

See also

References

External links

Photos and drawings at Ugolok Neba

1930s Polish civil utility aircraft
1930s Polish military utility aircraft
Single-engined tractor aircraft
High-wing aircraft
Aircraft first flown in 1937